The eighth series of Norske Talenter, Norway's edition of the Got Talent franchise, premiered on 13 January 2017, after a one-year hiatus. Judges Mia Gundersen, Bjarne Brøndbo, Suleman Malik, and Linn Skåber all returned, and Solveig Kloppen remained the host. The winner was 14-year-old sign language interpreter Vilde Winge. Although Winde performed her interpreting to music, this was the first time the winner of the show was not a vocalist, instrumentalist, or a dancer in the traditional sense of the term and first-place. Second-place was taken by the dance duo Gemini Crew (both 18 years old).

Golden buzzers
This was the second series to include a "golden buzzer", which sends an auditioning act directly to the live shows.

References

Norske Talenter
2017 Norwegian television seasons